Kopan Canal is a canal located close to Ocher city in Russia. It received its name from the Russian word ‘копать’ (dig),. This man-made canal connects the Cheptsa River to the Ocher river.

History
This man-made canal connects the Cheptsa river to the Ocher river. It was needed, as there was a lack of water in the Ocher factory pond; there was not enough water to make factory mechanisms work in 18-19 century. In order to make level of water in the pond higher, people decided to dig this canal. It took 2 years to build this canal During digging process more there worked more than 5 thousand peasant families . Because of grueling work, often  there were different revolts. Unfortunately, all these efforts didn’t give a result,  it was not enough water from Cheptsa river to fill the Ocher pond. Nowadays it is a place of tourists attraction, there are even special excursions. An only way to achieve the bottom of the canal is to use a long metal ladder

Location
 Russia, near

Facts

References

Canals in Russia